Patrycja Maliszewska (born  in Białystok) is a Polish short-track speed-skater.

Career
Maliszewska competed at the 2010 Winter Olympics for Poland. She finished fourth in the first round of the 500 metres and sixth in the first round of the 1500 metres, failing to advance. She finished 29th in each of her events.

As of 2013, Maliszewska's best finish at the World Championships is 10th, in the 500 metres in 2013. She also has one bronze medal as a member of the Polish relay team at the 2013 European Championships

As of 2013, Maliszewska has not finished on the podium on the ISU Short Track Speed Skating World Cup. Her top World Cup ranking is 9th, in the 500 metres in 2010–11.

The year 2015 for Maliszewska was the best performance at the European Championships  in her career where she won three medals  (gold and two bronze).

Personal life
Her younger sister Natalia Maliszewska is also short track speed skater.

See also
Sport in Poland

References 

1988 births
Living people
Polish female short track speed skaters
Olympic short track speed skaters of Poland
Short track speed skaters at the 2010 Winter Olympics
Short track speed skaters at the 2014 Winter Olympics
Short track speed skaters at the 2022 Winter Olympics
Sportspeople from Białystok